Lakes International Language Academy (LILA) is a language immersion school located in Forest Lake, Minnesota, USA. It is a public charter school and therefore does not charge for tuition, but there is an application for Kindergarten and the Upper School grades 6-12.

History 
LILA was founded by a group of parent volunteers in September 2004. Since its inception, the school has offered a Spanish language immersion program and, in 2011, LILA expanded to include a Mandarin Chinese language program as well.

Teachers plan and deliver lessons at LILA using primarily the target language, or second language. Teachers are either native speakers of the target language, or have acquired near-native speaking abilities. Subjects such as social studies, mathematics, science and technology, arts and physical education are taught in the second language. English, including reading and writing, is introduced as a formal subject in second grade.

In spring 2009, the International Baccalaureate Organization (IBO) awarded LILA accreditation in its International Baccalaureate Primary Years Programme (PYP). The success of the program also spurred the Forest Lake school district to develop its own language immersion programs.

LILA expanded from Pre-K-6 to grades 7-8 in the 2015–2016 school year and added grades 9-12 in the 2016–2017 school year. Students in grades 6-12 (the "Upper School") have the option to take selected classes in their second language. All classes are also offered in English for students without immersion backgrounds or who choose not to continue immersion learning.

References

External links 
 Official website
 The International Baccalaureate
 Facebook

Public elementary schools in Minnesota
Charter schools in Minnesota
2004 establishments in Minnesota